Gerald Frederick Kicanas (born August 18, 1941) is an American prelate of the Roman Catholic Church. He served as bishop of the Diocese of Tucson in Arizona from 2002 to 2017. He served as the apostolic administrator of the Diocese of Las Cruces in New Mexico from September 2018 to July 2019.

Biography

Early life 
Gerald Kicanas was born on August 18, 1941, in Chicago, Illinois, to parents of Lebanese heritage, Frederick and Eva Kicanas. He attended Immaculate Heart Elementary School and Archbishop Quigley Preparatory Seminary in Chicago. Kicanas obtained his Licentiate in Sacred Theology from the University of St. Mary of the Lake in Mundelein, Illinois.

Priesthood 
Kicanas was ordained by Cardinal John Patrick Cody to the priesthood for the Archdiocese of Chicago on April 27, 1967.  He then earned a Doctor of Educational Psychology degree and an Master of Education degree in guidance and counseling from Loyola University Chicago.

After working as an associate pastor until 1978, Kicanas held various offices at the archdiocesan seminary for over 25 years. He served as rector, principal, and dean of formation at Quigley Preparatory Seminary South in Chicago, and became rector of Mundelein Seminary at the University of St. Mary of the Lake in Mundelein, Illinois, in 1984. While rector, he also served as a lecturer in community and organization development at Loyola.

Kicanas' other diocesan jobs included acting as director of the Catholic Chaplaincy Program of the Juvenile Temporary Detention Center in Chicago, as a caseworker for Catholic Charities, and as chaplain for the Chicago Parental School, a facility for troubled boys.

Auxiliary Bishop of Chicago 
On January 24, 1995, Pope John Paul II named Kicanas as an auxiliary bishop of the Archdiocese of Chicago and titular bishop of Bela. He received his episcopal consecration on March 20, 1995, from Cardinal Joseph Bernardin, with Bishops Alfred Abramowicz and Timothy Lyne serving as co-consecrators. Kicanas chose to express his episcopal motto in both Spanish and English: "La Justicia Promueve La Paz and "Justice begets peace".

During his tenure as an auxiliary bishop, Kicanas served as episcopal vicar for Vicariate I in the archdiocese, which includes Lake and Cook Counties. He also became involved with vocations, the permanent diaconate, and encouragement of lay ministry.

On January 24, 2012, the archdiocese released extensive records on the handling of sexual abuse allegations.  These records showed decisions made by Kicanas in two cases.

 The first case was that of Daniel McCormack, a student at Mundelein Seminary when Kicanas was its administrator.  According to the records, Kicanas knew about sexual abuse allegations against McCormack, but allowed his ordination anyway.  In a statement, Kicanas denied knowledge of any accusations at that time.
 The second Chicago case involving Kicanas was that of Russ Romano, a priest in the archdiocese.  The records showed the following statement mentioning Kicanas:"I spoke to Jerry Kicanas and he suggested a two-part approach to Russ:  First, express concern for Russ and his personal problems, and second, to make it very clear that the drinking, movies, hugs, and kisses with our students must stop immediately."  In a 2012 response to the Romano case, Kicanas said that he was unaware at that time of sexual abuse allegations against Romano and would have asked for a much stronger response had he known.

Bishop of Tucson 
Kicanas was named coadjutor bishop of the Diocese of Tucson on October 30, 2001 and became bishop after the resignation of Bishop Manuel Moreno on March 7, 2003. Kicanas has been praised for his handling of the sexual abuse crisis in his diocese, which had declared bankruptcy due to settlement costs.

On November 13, 2007, Kicanas was elected vice-president of the United States Conference of Catholic Bishops (USCCB), receiving 22 more votes than Archbishop Timothy Dolan. On February 28, 2008, the USCCB chose Kicanas as a member of the American delegation to the twelfth World Synod of Bishops in Vatican City in October 2008. In June 2009, Kicanas spoke at the annual meeting of the National Leadership Roundtable on Church Management at the Wharton School in Philadelphia. His talk addressed the need for effective communications in the Catholic Church.

On November 16, 2010, Dolan defeated Kicanas in the vote for USCCB president. It was the first time in USCCB history that a sitting vice president was not elected president. According to an article in America: The Jesuit Review, conservative catholic groups had mounted a strong lobbying campaign against Kicanas within the USCCB.  On November 17, 2010, Cardinal Francis George, outgoing USCCB president, appointed Kicanas as chair of the board of directors of Catholic Relief Services.

Kicanas served as chair of the board of the Center for Applied Research in the Apostolate (CARA) in Washington, D.C. and was a member of the board of directors of the National Pastoral Life Center in New York City.

Retirement 
In 2017, Pope Francis accepted the resignation of Kicanas as bishop of the Diocese of Tucson and named as his successor Bishop Edward J. Weisenburger, who had served as bishop of the Diocese of Salina since 2012.

Kicanas assumed the duties as chair of the board of directors at The National Catholic Educational Association on January 1, 2018, replacing Bishop George V. Murry. On September 28, 2018, Kicanas was named temporary apostolic administrator of the Diocese of Las Cruces after Bishop Oscar Cantu was appointed bishop of the Diocese of San Jose. His assignment as administrator in Las Cruces ended on July 23, 2019. In December 2021, Kicanas underwent successful open heart surgery at Banner University Medical Center in Tucson. Kicanas remains in Tucson as bishop emeritus, assisting Bishop Weisenburger with pastoral duties around the diocese.

Honors and awards
 Honorary Doctorate in Humanities from Lewis University in Romeoville, Illinois, in 2010
 Honorary Doctor of Laws from the University of Notre Dame in Notre Dame, Indiana, in 2011
 Cardinal Joseph Bernardin Award from the Catholic Common Ground Initiative in 2008
 Bishop John England Award from the Catholic Media Association in 2018

References

External links

 Roman Catholic Diocese of Tucson Official Site
 John L. Allen Jr., "Synod: Interview with Bishop Gerald Kicanas", National Catholic Reporter, October 13, 2008
 Gerald Kicanas, "When the soul sees desperate need, it does not turn away", National Catholic Reporter, August 9, 2016
 Catholic-Hierarchy
 Diocese of Tucson biography
 USCCB Office of Media Relations

Episcopal succession

1941 births
Living people
University of Saint Mary of the Lake alumni
Loyola University Chicago alumni
People from Chicago
Roman Catholic Archdiocese of Chicago
Roman Catholic bishops of Tucson
Religious leaders from Illinois
Catholics from Illinois
American people of Lebanese descent